The South African records in swimming in Swimming are the fastest times ever swum by a swimmer representing South Africa. These records are kept/maintained by South Africa's national swimming federation: Swimming South Africa (SSA). Records are recognized for long course (50m) and short course (25m) events:
freestyle: 50, 100, 200, 400, 800 and 1500;
backstroke: 50, 100 and 200;
breaststroke: 50, 100 and 200;
butterfly: 50, 100 and 200;
individual medley: 100 (25m only), 200 and 400;

All records were set in finals unless noted otherwise.

Long Course (50 m)

Men

Women

Mixed relay

Short Course (25 m)

Men

Women

Mixed relay

References
General
South African Long Course Records 6 February 2021 updated
South African Short Course Records 6 February 2021 updated
Specific

External links
 SSA web site

South Africa
Records
Swimming records
Swimming